Rizakan (also Romanized as Rīzakān and Rīz Kān; also known as Rezā Kān and Rīzahkān) is a village in Sarvestan Rural District, in the Central District of Bavanat County, Fars Province, Iran. At the 2006 census, its population was 149, in 39 families.

References 

Populated places in Bavanat County